Before the NATO ASCC reporting names became widely used, the USAF and United States Department of Defense applied their own system of allocating code names on newly discovered Soviet aircraft. Each item was given a type number sequentially, but it soon became obvious that the system was impractical over a long period of time, being abandoned in 1955, in favour of the NATO ASCC reporting name system.

Some aircraft that were allocated USAF DoD type numbers were never allocated NATO reporting names. Inconsistencies in contemporary published lists have led to presumed re-allocations, predicated on research using contemporary Soviet documents by Helge Bergander.

The US DoD also assigned codes to newly discovered Soviet or Chinese aircraft and equipment, which had not yet been identified, consisting of code for the site it was first identified, and a sequential letter.

USAF/DoD preliminary aircraft identification
Following are USAF/DoD Aircraft type numbers and NATO reporting names. Where there are two entries for a type, the source is noted as either "Bergander" or "published" (details in citation).

DoD preliminary codes

Notes

US DoD preliminary codes for research and prototype missiles
This designation system is similar to the system used for prototype aircraft, but instead of sequential letters, numerical sequences are used.

Notes

References 

 
Naming conventions
Military aviation
Naval warfare
Code names